The 1999 Pennzoil 400 Presented by Kmart was an inaugural NASCAR Winston Cup Series race held on November 14, 1999 at Homestead Miami Speedway in Homestead, Florida. Contested over 267 laps on the 1.5 mile (2.4 km) speedway, it was the 33rd race of the 1999 NASCAR Winston Cup Series season and the first at Homestead-Miami Speedway. Tony Stewart of Joe Gibbs Racing won the race, his teammate Bobby Labonte finished second and Roush Racing driver Jeff Burton was third.

David Green would earn his only pole position during qualifying. He led the first seven laps until John Andretti passed him on lap eight. Labonte took the lead on lap 27, holding the place for a total of 174 laps, more than any other driver. On the 228th lap, Stewart overtook Labonte for the first position, and later went on to win the event, his third career triumph in the Cup Series. Drivers' Championship leader Dale Jarrett had a lead of 231 points entering the race, and his fifth place finish was enough to clinch the championship, and claim his first (and only) NASCAR Cup Series title, leading by 211 points at the checkered flag. There was a single caution and a total of nineteen lead changes amongst ten different drivers during the course of the race.

This was the last race without Dale Earnhardt Jr. until the 2012 Bank of America 500.

Race results

Failed to Qualify
71 - Dave Marcis
90 - Ed Berrier
41 - Derrike Cope
04 - Andy Belmont
61 - Bob Strait

References

Pennzoil 400
Pennzoil 400
NASCAR races at Homestead-Miami Speedway